North Carolina's 36th Senate district is one of 50 districts in the North Carolina Senate. It has been represented by Republican Eddie Settle since 2023.

Geography
Since 2013, the district has included all of Alexander, Wilkes, Surry, and Yadkin counties. The district overlaps with the 77th, 90th, and 94th state house districts.

District officeholders since 1993

Election results

2022

2020

2018

2016

2014

2012

2010

2008

2006

2004

2002

2000

References

North Carolina Senate districts
Alexander County, North Carolina
Wilkes County, North Carolina
Surry County, North Carolina
Yadkin County, North Carolina